William Rotheram (by 1519 – will proved 1559), of Lincoln was an English Mayor and Member of Parliament.

He was appointed sheriff of Lincoln for 1545, made Mayor of Lincoln for 1554–55 and elected a Member (MP) of the Parliament of England for Lincoln in April 1554.

He was married with a son and two daughters.

References

1559 deaths
Members of the Parliament of England (pre-1707) for Lincoln
Mayors of Lincoln, England
English MPs 1554
Year of birth uncertain